Electric tractors are powered by electric vehicle batteries, or, in the case of plug-ins, by an electric power cable.

Advantages 
Electric tractors offer several advantages over diesel tractors. An electric motor needs less maintenance than a diesel motor, which has hundreds of moving parts. Electricity can offer cost savings over diesel fuel. Greenhouse gas emissions, estimated at 53 tons per year for a typical diesel tractor, are drastically reduced.

Manufacturers 
Electric tractors are manufactured by a German company, Fendt, and by US companies, Solectrac and Monarch Tractor. 

In October 2022, The US-American company Ideanomics, which specializes in electric utility vehicles, has commissioned what it claims is the largest assembly plant for electric tractors in North America. The plant in Windsor, California, has the capacity to produce 4,100 electric tractors annually. The vehicles built in Windsor are from Solectrac, a manufacturer acquired by Ideanomics. 

John Deere's protoype electric tractor is a plug-in, powered by an electrical cable. 

Kubota is prototyping an autonomous electric tractor.

See also 
Climate-smart agriculture
Greenhouse gas emissions from agriculture

References 

 Electric tractors